Tangoa may refer to:
Tangoa (island), an island of Vanuatu;
Tangoa language, the Oceanic language spoken on this island.